Hasanabad (also Hassanabad or Həsənabad) is a common name from villages in Iran and is also used in other countries. It may refer to:

Iran

Alborz Province
 Hasanabad, Eshtehard, a village in Eshtehard County
 Hasanabad-e Majd ol Dolleh, a village in Nazarabad County
 Hasanabad, Savojbolagh, a village in Savojbolagh County

Ardabil Province
 Hasanabad, Ardabil, a village in Meshgin Shahr County

Bushehr Province
 Hasanabad, Bushehr, a village in Dashtestan County
 Hasanabad-e Abu ol Fath, a village in Deylam County

East Azerbaijan Province
 Hasanabad, Malekan, a village in Malekan County
 Hasanabad, Meyaneh, a village in Meyaneh County
 Hasanabad, Kaghazkonan, a village in Meyaneh County
 Hasanabad, Osku, a village in Osku County

Fars Province

Abadeh County

Arsanjan County
 Hasanabad, Arsanjan, a village in Arsanjan County
 Hasanabad, Shurab, a village in Arsanjan County

Darab County
 Hasanabad, Bakhtajerd, a village in Darab County
 Hasanabad, Nasrovan, a village in Darab County
 Hasanabad, Paskhan, a village in Darab County
 Hasanabad-e Padam, a village in Darab County

Eqlid County
 Hasanabad, Eqlid, a village in Eqlid County
 Hasanabad District, in Eqlid County
 Hasanabad Rural District (Fars Province), in Eqlid County

Fasa County
 Hasanabad, Fasa, a village in Fasa County

Kazerun County
 Hasanabad, Kazerun, a village in Kazerun County
 Hasanabad, Balyan, a village in Kazerun County
 Hasanabad, Khesht, a village in Kazerun County
 Hasanabad-e Abu ol Hasani, a village in Kazerun County
 Hasanabad-e Olya, Fars, a village in Kazerun County
 Hasanabad-e Sofla, Fars, a village in Kazerun County
 Hasanabad, alternate name of Hoseynabad, Kazerun, a village in Kazerun County

Kharameh County
 Hasanabad, Kharameh, a village in Kharameh County

Lamerd County
 Hasanabad-e Tarman, a village in Lamerd County

Larestan County
 Hasanabad, Larestan, a village in Larestan County
 Hasanabad-e Margemari, a village in Larestan County

Marvdasht County
 Hasanabad, Majdabad, a village in Marvdasht County
 Hasanabad, Naqsh-e Rostam, a village in Marvdasht County
 Hasanabad, Rudbal, a village in Marvdasht County
 Hasanabad, Seyyedan, a village in Marvdasht County
 Hasanabad-e Tall Kamin, a village in Marvdasht County

Neyriz County
 Hasanabad, Abadeh Tashk, a village in Neyriz County
 Hasanabad, Neyriz, a village in Neyriz County
 Hasanabad, Qatruyeh, a village in Neyriz County

Pasargad County
 Hasanabad, Pasargad, a village in Pasargad County

Qir and Karzin County

Sarvestan County

Sepidan County

Shiraz County
 Hasanabad, Shiraz, a village in Shiraz County

Gilan Province
 Hasanabad, Langarud, a village in Langarud County
 Hasanabad, Rasht, a village in Rasht County

Golestan Province
 Hasanabad, Golestan, a village in Gonbad-e Qabus County

Hamadan Province
 Hasanabad-e Emam, a village in Asadabad County
 Hasanabad, Famenin, a village in Famenin County
 Hasanabad-e Sheverin, a village in Hamadan County
 Hasanabad, Kabudarahang, a village in Kabudarahang County
 Hasanabad, Shirin Su, a village in Kabudarahang County
 Hasanabad-e Qush Bolagh, a village in Malayer County
 Hasanabad-e Shamlu, a village in Malayer County
 Hasanabad, alternate name of Gerdian, Hamadan, a village in Nahavand County
 Hasanabad, alternate name of Hoseynabad-e Serkan, a village in Nahavand County
 Hasanabad, Razan, a village in Razan County

Hormozgan Province
 Hasanabad, Bandar Lengeh, a village in Bandar Lengeh County
 Hasanabad, Hajjiabad, a village in Hajjiabad County
 Hasanabad, Ahmadi, a village in Hajjiabad County
 Hasanabad-e Ziarat, a village in Minab County

Isfahan Province
 Hasanabad, Aran va Bidgol, a village in Aran va Bidgol County
 Hasanabad, Garmsir, a village in Ardestan County
 Hasanabad, Olya, a village in Ardestan County
 Hasanabad, Falavarjan, a village in Falavarjan County
 Hasanabad, Golpayegan, a village in Golpayegan County
 Hasanabad, Isfahan, a city in Isfahan County
 Hasanabad, Qahab-e Jonubi, a village in Isfahan County
 Hasanabad, Khvansar, a village in Khvansar County
 Hasanabad, Mobarakeh, a village in Mobarakeh County
 Hasanabad-e Tavakkoli, a village in Nain County
 Hasanabad, Natanz, a village in Natanz County
 Hasanabad-e Abrizeh, a village in Tiran and Kaarvan County
 Hasanabad-e Kohneh, Isfahan, a village in Tiran and Karvan County
 Hasanabad-e Olya, Isfahan, a village in Tiran and Karvan County
 Hasanabad-e Vosta, a village in Tiran and Karvan County

Kerman Province

Anar County

Anbarabad County
 Hasanabad, Esmaili, a village in Anbarabad County
 Hasanabad-e Nazarian, a village in Anbarabad County
 Hasanabad-e Yek, Anbarabad, a village in Anbarabad County
 Hasanabad, Jebalbarez-e Jonubi, a village in Anbarabad County

Arzuiyeh County
 Hasanabad, Arzuiyeh, a village in Arzuiyeh County
 Hasanabad, Soghan, a village in Arzuiyeh County

Baft County
 Hasanabad-e Olya, Kerman, a village in Baft County
 Hasanabad-e Sofla, Kerman, a village in Baft County

Bam County
 Hasanabad-e Bala-ye Darestan, a village in Bam County

Bardsir County
 Hasanabad, Negar, a village in Bardsir County

Fahraj County
 Hasanabad, Fahraj, a village in Fahraj County
 Hasanabad-e Chah Degan, a village in Fahraj County
 Hasanabad-e Deh Gavi, a village in Fahraj County

Faryab County
 Hasanabad, Faryab, a village in Faryab County

Jiroft County

Kerman County
 Hasanabad, Golbaf, a village in Kerman County

Kuhbanan County
 Hasanabad-e Qotbi, a village in Kuhbanan County

Narmashir County
 Hasanabad-e Dabirnezam, a village in Narmashir County
 Hasanabad-e Deh Koreh, a village in Narmashir County

Rafsanjan County
 Hasanabad, Ferdows, a village in Rafsanjan County
 Hasanabad-e Navvab, a village in Rafsanjan County
 Hasanabad-e Nushabad, a village in Rafsanjan County
 Hasanabad-e Zandi, a village in Rafsanjan County

Rigan County
 Hasanabad, Gonbaki, a village in Rigan County
 Hassanabad-e Ab Shur, a village in Rigan County
 Hasanabad-e Jahanabad, a village in Rigan County

Rudbar-e Jonubi County
 Hasanabad, Rudbar-e Jonubi, a village in Rudbar-e Jonubi County

Shahr-e Babak County
 Hasanabad, Shahr-e Babak, a village in Shahr-e Babak County

Sirjan County
 Hasanabad, Mahmudabad-e Seyyed, a village in Sirjan County
 Hasanabad-e Mehrab Jan, a village in Sirjan County
 Hasanabad-e Yek, Sirjan, a village in Sirjan County
 Hasanabad-e Yek, Saadatabad, a village in Sirjan County

Zarand County

Kermanshah Province
 Hasanabad, Eslamabad-e Gharb, a village in Eslamabad-e Gharb County
 Hasanabad Rural District (Eslamabad-e Gharb County)
 Hasanabad, Kangavar, a village in Kangavar County
 Hasanabad, Kermanshah, a village in Kermanshah County
 Hasanabad, Ravansar, a village in Ravansar County
 Hasanabad-e Karah, a village in Ravansar County
 Hasanabad Integrated Farm Town, a village in Ravansar County
 Hasanabad Rural District (Ravansar County)
 Hasanabad-e Olya, Kermanshah, a village in Sahneh County
 Hasanabad-e Sofla, Kermanshah, a village in Sahneh County
 Hasanabad, Sonqor, a village in Sonqor County
 Hasanabad, Kolyai, a village in Sonqor County

Khuzestan Province
 Hasanabad, Andika, a village in Andika County
 Hasanabad, Masjed Soleyman, a village in Masjed Soleyman County
 Hasanabad-e Tangeh Mu, a village in Masjed Soleyman County
 Hasanabad, Shushtar, a village in Shushtar County

Kohgiluyeh and Boyer-Ahmad Province
 Hasanabad-e Tabarqu, a village in Boyer-Ahmad County
 Hasanabad-e Tang Sorkh, a village in Boyer-Ahmad County
 Hasanabad-e Kareyak, a village in Dana County

Kurdistan Province
 Hasanabad, Baneh, a village in Baneh County
 Hasanabad, Bijar, a village in Bijar County
 Hasanabad-e Charuq, a village in Bijar County
 Hasanabad-e Yasukand, a city in Bijar County
 Hasanabad, Dehgolan, a village in Dehgolan County
 Hasanabad, Qorveh, a village in Qorveh County
 Hasanabad, Sanandaj, a village in Sanandaj County
 Hasanabad, Saqqez, a village in Saqqez County
 Hasanabad, Ziviyeh, a village in Saqqez County

Lorestan Province
 Hasanabad, Aligudarz, a village in Aligudarz County
 Hasanabad-e Bala, Lorestan, a village in Delfan County
 Hasanabad Bey Baba, a village in Delfan County
 Hasanabad-e Sanjabi, a village in Delfan County
 Hasanabad, Azna, a village in Khorramabad County
 Hasanabad, Dehpir, a village in Khorramabad County
 Hasanabad, Koregah-e Gharbi, a village in Khorramabad County
 Hasanabad-e Gilavand, a village in Khorramabad County
 Hasanabad, Honam, a village in Selseleh County
 Hasanabad, Qaleh-ye Mozaffari, a village in Selseleh County
 Hasanabad, alternate name of Shirvan, Lorestan

Markazi Province
 Hasanabad, Arak, a village in Arak County
 Hasanabad-e Band, a village in Saveh County
 Hasanabad, Sarband, a village in Shazand County
 Hasanabad (34°03′ N 49°21′ E), Shazand, a village in Shazand County
 Hasanabad-e Qarah Darband, a village in Zarandieh County

Mazandaran Province
 Hasanabad, Amol, a village in Amol County
 Hasanabad, Mahmudabad, a village in Mahmudabad County
 Hasanabad, Nowshahr, a village in Nowshahr County
 Hasanabad, Kojur, a village in Nowshahr County
 Hasanabad, Sari, a village in Sari County

North Khorasan Province
 Hasanabad, Garmkhan, a village in Bojnord County
 Hasanabad, Raz and Jargalan, a village in Bojnord County
 Hasanabad, Azari, a village in Esfarayen County
 Hasanabad, Esfarayen, a village in Esfarayen County
 Hasanabad-e Chenar Sukhteh, a village in Esfarayen County
 Hasanabad, Maneh and Samalqan, a village in Maneh and Samalqan County
 Hasanabad, alternate name of Hasan Mast, a village in Maneh and Samalqan County

Qazvin Province
 Hasanabad-e Kalej, a village in Basharyat District, Abyek County
 Hasanabad, Avaj, a village in Avaj District, Buin Zahra County
 Hasanabad, Dashtabi, a village in Dashtabi District, Buin Zahra County
 Hasanabad, Qazvin, a village in the Central District of Qazvin County
 Hasanabad, Alamut-e Gharbi, a village in Alamut-e Gharbi District, Qazvin County
 Hasanabad, Rudbar-e Alamut, a village in Rudbar-e Alamut District, Qazvin County
 Hasanabad, Tarom Sofla, a village in Tarom Sofla District, Qazvin County
 Hasanabad-e Sadat, a village in Takestan County

Qom Province
 Hasanabad, Khalajastan, a village in Khalajastan District, Qom County
 Hasanabad, Salafchegan, a village in Salafchegan District, Qom County
 Hasanabad, alternate name of Hoseynabad-e Mish Mast

Razavi Khorasan Province

Bardaskan County
 Hasanabad, Bardaskan, a village in Bardaskan County

Chenaran County
 Hasanabad-e Amelzadeh, a village in Chenaran County
 Hasanabad-e Manqashali, a village in Chenaran County

Dargaz County
 Hasanabad, Dargaz, a village in Dargaz County

Fariman County
 Hasanabad, Fariman, a village in Fariman County
 Hasanabad, Qalandarabad, a village in Fariman County
 Hasanabad-e Sufi, a village in Fariman County

Firuzeh County
 Hasanabad-e Salar, a village in Firuzeh County

Kalat County
 Hasanabad-e Layen-e Now, a village in Kalat County

Khoshab County
 Hasanabad, Khoshab, a village in Khoshab County

Khvaf County
 Hasanabad, Jolgeh Zozan, a village in Khvaf County
 Hasanabad, Salami, a village in Khvaf County

Mahvelat County
 Hasanabad, Mahvelat, a village in Mahvelat County

Mashhad County
 Hasanabad, Abravan, a village in Mashhad County
 Hasanabad, Ahmadabad, a village in Mashhad County
 Hasanabad, Mashhad, a village in Mashhad County
 Hasanabad, Meyami, a village in Mashhad County
 Hasanabad-e Gorji, a village in Mashhad County

Nishapur County
 Hasanabad, Nishapur, a village in Nishapur County
 Hasanabad, Miyan Jolgeh, a village in Nishapur County
 Hasanabad-e Belher, a village in Nishapur County
 Hasanabad-e Emam Jomeh, a village in Nishapur County
 Hasanabad-e Sabrow, a village in Nishapur County
 Hasanabad-e Sar Tappeh, a village in Nishapur County

Quchan County
 Hasanabad, Quchan, a village in Quchan County

Rashtkhvar County

Sabzevar County
 Hasanabad, Beyhaq, a village in Sabzevar County
 Hasanabad, Rob-e Shamat, a village in Sabzevar County

Torbat-e Jam County
 Hasanabad, Torbat-e Jam, a village in Torbat-e Jam County
 Hasanabad, Nasrabad, a village in Torbat-e Jam County
 Hasanabad, Salehabad, a village in Torbat-e Jam County
 Hasanabad-e Aqa Beyk, a village in Torbat-e Jam County
 Hasanabad-e Kohneh, a village in Torbat-e Jam County

Torqabeh and Shandiz County
 Hasanabad, Torqabeh and Shandiz, a village in Torqabeh and Shandiz County

Semnan Province
 Hasanabad, Amirabad, a village in Damghan County
 Hasanabad, Garmsar, a village in Garmsar County
 Hasanabad, Semnan, a village in Semnan County

Sistan and Baluchestan Province
 Hasanabad, Dalgan, a village in Dalgan County
 Hasanabad-e Dastgerd, a village in Khash County
 Hasanabad-e Shandak, a village in Khash County

South Khorasan Province
 Hasanabad-e Mian, a village in Birjand County
 Hasanabad-e Pain, a village in Birjand County
 Hasanabad, Darmian, a village in Darmian County
 Hasanabad, Ferdows, South Khorasan, a village in Ferdows County
 Hasanabad-e Sar Kal, a village in Nehbandan County
 Hasanabad, Arabkhaneh, a village in Nehbandan County
 Hasanabad-e Korq-e Sang, a village in Nehbandan County
 Hasanabad, Qaen, a village in Qaen County
 Hasanabad, Dastgerdan, a village in Tabas County
 Hasanabad (1), Deyhuk, a village in Tabas County
 Hasanabad Qavam, a village in Tabas County
 Hasanabad, Zirkuh, a village in Zirkuh County
 Hasanabad, Zohan, a village in Zirkuh County

Tehran Province
 Hasanabad, Iran, a city in Rey County
 Hasanabad, Tehran, a neighborhood of Tehran, Iran
 Hasanabad-e Baqeraf, a village in Tehran County
 Hasanabad-e Khaleseh, a village in Eslamshahr County
 Hasanabad-e Kuh Gach, a village in Varamin County
 Hasanabad-e Mir Hashemi, a village in Malard County
 Hasanabad Rural District (Ray County), Tehran province

West Azerbaijan Province
 Hasanabad, Bukan, a village in Bukan County
 Hasanabad, Miandoab, a village in Miandoab County
 Hasanabad, Oshnavieh, a village in Oshnavieh County
 Hasanabad, Sardasht, a village in Sardasht County
 Hasanabad, Takab, a village in Takab County
 Hasanabad, Urmia, a village in Urmia County
 Hasanabad, Silvaneh, a village in Urmia County
 Hasanabad, Sumay-ye Beradust, a village in Urmia County

Yazd Province

Ardakan County
 Hasanabad, Aqda, a village in Ardakan County
 Hasanabad, Kharanaq, a village in Ardakan County
 Hasanabad-e Anaraki, a village in Ardakan County

Bafq County

Khatam County
 Hasanabad, Khatam, a village in Khatam County
 Hasanabad, alternate name of Hoseynabad, Khatam, a village in Khatam County

Mehriz County
 Hasanabad (31°25′ N 54°18′ E), Mehriz, a village in Mehriz County

Meybod County
 Hasanabad, Meybod, a village in Meybod County

Saduq County
 Hasanabad, Saduq, a village in Saduq County

Taft County
 Hasanabad, Taft, a village in Taft County
 Hasanabad-e Darreh Zereshk, a village in Taft County
 Hasanabad-e Marshad, a village in Taft County
 asanabad, alternate name of Lay-e Landar, a village in Taft County

Yazd County

Zanjan Province
 Hasanabad, Khodabandeh, a village in Khodabandeh County
 Hasanabad, Mahneshan, a village in Mahneshan County
 Hasanabad-e Jadid, a village in Mahneshan County
 Hasanabad-e Qadim, a village in Mahneshan County
 Hasanabad, Zanjan, a village in Zanjan County

Other countries

Azerbaijan
 Həsənabad, Azerbaijan

Pakistan
 Hassanabad, Chorbat, Baltistan

See also
 Hasanabad-e Kohneh (disambiguation)
 Hasanabad Rural District (disambiguation)
 Hasnabad (community development block), an administrative division in Basirhat subdivision of North 24 Parganas district in the Indian state of West Bengal
 Hosenabad (disambiguation)
 Hoseynabad (disambiguation)
 Hussainabad (disambiguation)